A wormhole is a hypothetical topological feature of spacetime. 

Wormhole may also refer to:

 Bajoran wormhole, a wormhole located near the planet Bajor in the fictional Star Trek universe
 Wormholes: Essays and Occasional Writings, a book containing writings from four decades by the English author John Fowles
 Wormhole switching, a technique in computer science
 "Wormhole X-Treme!", an episode of the science fiction television series Stargate SG-1
 Wormholes (film), a 1992 animated short film by Stephen Hillenburg
 "Wormhole" (album), by drum and bass act Ed Rush & Optical

See also
 Wormholes in fiction
 Wormhole Physics (disambiguation)
 Through the Wormhole, a television documentary series hosted by Morgan Freeman